Sergey Sergeyevich Smirnov (1915–1976) was a Soviet writer, a historian, a radio- and TV-presenter, a public figure, a Lenin Prize winner (1965). Member of the RCP(b) since 1946.

Smirnov was born into an engineer's family. He quit Moscow Power Engineering Institute without getting a degree and entered the Maxim Gorky Literature Institute. In 1941 he went to the front. After the war he worked as an editor in Voenizdat.

Sergey was the deputy editor-in-chief of Novy mir (November 1953 – October 1954), the editor-in-chief of Literaturnaya Gazeta in 1959—1960. The Secretary of the Union of Soviet Writers (1975—1976).

Smirnov was famous for his books about heroes of the Great Patriotic War. He did a lot to immortalize heroic deeds of unknown soldiers and to find soldiers missing in action.

External links 
 Сергей Смирнов. Брестская крепость (Brest Fortress (in Russian))
 Сергей Смирнов. Рассказы о неизвестных героях (Short stories about Unknown Heroes (in Russian))
 С.Смирнов. Подробная биография (Detailed biography (in Russian))
 В строю обречённых (In the Ranks of the Doomed (in Russian))
 Краткая литературная энциклопедия (An Article from the Literary Encyclopedia (in Russian))

1915 births
1976 deaths
Soviet male writers
Maxim Gorky Literature Institute alumni
Recipients of the Order of the Red Banner of Labour
Recipients of the Order of the Red Star
Communist Party of the Soviet Union members
Recipients of the Order of Lenin
Socialist realism writers
Soviet war correspondents
Members of the Supreme Soviet of the Russian Soviet Federative Socialist Republic, 1975–1980
Soviet television presenters
Soviet editors
Burials at Novodevichy Cemetery
Moscow Power Engineering Institute alumni
Writers from Saint Petersburg